= Lê Hiền Đức =

Vietnamese activist (born 1932)

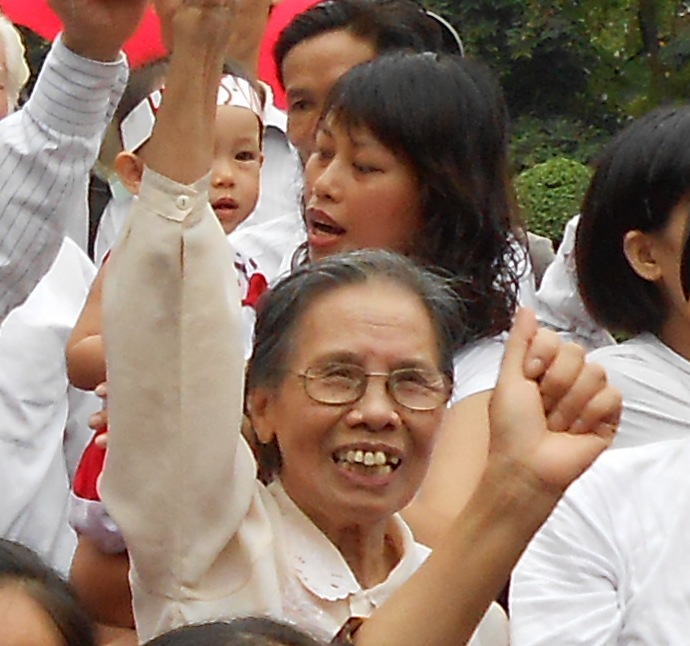

Lê Hiền Đức (born Phạm Thị Dung Mỹ on December 12, 1932), is a retired Vietnamese teacher who has been active in anti-corruption activities, is one of two laureates of 2007 Integrity Award by Transparency International. She is now living in Hanoi, Vietnam and is acting as an advisor for those who denounce corruption cases of the governmental bodies and individuals. She has been repeatedly threatened by many involved persons but keeps on her actions. She spends most of her retired pay on her anti-corruption work.
